Zhao Ruirui (born 8 October 1981 in Nanjing, Jiangsu, China) is a Chinese volleyball player who competed on the 2003 FIVB Volleyball Women's World Cup winning side and made an initial appearance with the 2004 gold medal winning side before refracturing her right leg. Following her retirement in 2009 from sports competition, she has become a successful sci-fi author and published several critically acclaimed novels. Her sci-fi novel (The Wing Man) won the Silver Award of the 4th Global Chinese Nebula Award in 2013.

Career
Zhao won the 2001 World Grand Champion Cup and the 2003 World Grand Prix 2003 gold medals. She also won the 2003 World Cup and the 2004 Athens Olympic Games 2004 gold medals and the 2008 Beijing Olympic Games 2008 bronze medal.

Awards

Individuals
 2003 Asian Women's Volleyball Championship "Most Valuable Player"
 2003 Asian Women's Volleyball Championship "Best Blocker"
 2003 FIVB World Cup "Best Spiker"

References

External links
 zhaoruirui.com

1981 births
Living people
Chinese women's volleyball players
Olympic bronze medalists for China
Olympic gold medalists for China
Olympic volleyball players of China
Sportspeople from Nanjing
Volleyball players at the 2004 Summer Olympics
Volleyball players at the 2008 Summer Olympics
Olympic medalists in volleyball
Medalists at the 2008 Summer Olympics
Medalists at the 2004 Summer Olympics
Asian Games medalists in volleyball
Volleyball players at the 2002 Asian Games
Asian Games gold medalists for China
Volleyball players from Jiangsu
Chinese science fiction writers
Writers from Nanjing
People's Republic of China writers
Medalists at the 2002 Asian Games
Middle blockers
21st-century Chinese women